Mollett is a surname. Notable people with the surname include:

Callum Cockerill-Mollett (born 1999), English-born Irish footballer
Ryan Mollett (born 1978), American finance executive and lacrosse player

See also
Smollett

English-language surnames